The 1986–87 Primera División B was the second category of the Spanish basketball league system during the 1986–87 season.

Format 
24 teams played this season.

First phase
Two groups; called Even and Odd, with 12 teams each, where they all play against everyone in their group at two laps.

Second phase
Group B1: Made up of those classified in the 1st, 2nd, 3rd, 4th, 5th and 6th of each group.
Group B2: Made up of those classified in the 7th, 8th, 9th, 10th,11th and 12th of each group.

Promotion
Top two teams of Group B1 are promoted to the ACB League.

He had planned a third phase of play-off, where those classified 2nd to 9th of B1 would play for the second promotion and from 3 to 10th of B2 would play to avoid two of the four relegations. However, this phase was never played due to a conflict between the clubs and the FEB on account of the number of promotions, which finally went from three to two. Thus, there were no decreases, increasing the category from 24 to 28 teams for the following season.

Teams

Promotion and relegation (pre-season) 
A total of 24 teams contested the league, including 11 sides from the 1986–87 season, three relegated from the 1985–86 ACB, four promoted from the Segunda División and six Wild Cards.

Teams relegated from Liga ACB
CD Cajamadrid
Coronas Las Palmas
Metro Santa Coloma

Teams promoted from Segunda División
BC Andorra
Caixa Ourense
CB Guadalajara
Elosúa León

Wild Cards
Coalsa Bosco
Tradehi Oviedo
Pamesa Valencia
Colecor Córdoba
Ecoahorro Maristas
CB Badajoz

Teams that resigned to participate
RC Nautico sold his place to Tenerife AB
Seguros Caudal
Canoe NC
CB Hospitalet sold his place to Valvi Girona
Institución Logos sold his place to Júver Murcia

Venues and locations

First Round

Group Odd

Group Even

Second Round 
The results of the first phase are maintained, therefore 12 matches are played in total.

Group B1

Group B2

Final standings

References

External links
League at JM Almenzar website
hispaligas.net

Primera División B de Baloncesto
1986–87 in Spanish basketball
Second level Spanish basketball league seasons